Platydorina is a genus of green algae in the family Volvocaceae.

References

External links

Chlamydomonadales
Chlamydomonadales genera